"Playboy" is a song composed by Brian Holland, Robert Bateman, Mickey Stevenson and singer Gladys Horton, lead vocalist of the Motown singing group The Marvelettes, who recorded the song and released it as a single on Motown's Tamla imprint in 1962. The single, led by Horton, is about a man who fools around with a lot of women and the woman who narrates the story warns him to stay away from her due to the stories she heard of him "running around with every woman in town". Horton is helped out in the song by her Marvelettes cohorts Wanda Young, Georgeanna Tillman, Katherine Anderson & Juanita Cowart. This was released as the third single by the Marvelettes and was their second top ten pop hit reaching number seven on the charts while reaching number four on the R&B chart.

The song is sampled in the Dickie Goodman novelty break-in record "Ben Crazy" (1962). A satire on the Television Doctor's show "Ben Casey".

Credits
Lead vocal by Gladys Horton
Background vocals by Wanda Young, Georgeanna Tillman, Katherine Anderson and Juanita Cowart
Instrumentation by The Funk Brothers
Produced by William "Mickey" Stevenson

References

1962 singles
The Marvelettes songs
Songs written by Brian Holland
Songs written by William "Mickey" Stevenson
Tamla Records singles
1961 songs
Songs written by Robert Bateman (songwriter)